The New Zealand Gallantry Decoration (NZGD) is the third level military decoration of the New Zealand armed forces.

It was instituted by Royal Warrant on 20 September 1999 as part of the new indigenous New Zealand Gallantry system.  The medal, which may be awarded posthumously, is granted in recognition of  'acts of exceptional gallantry in situations of danger' while involved in war and warlike operational service (including peacekeeping).

Bars are awarded to the NZGS in recognition of the performance of further acts of gallantry meriting the award.  Recipients are entitled to the postnominal letters "N.Z.G.D.".

This medal replaced the award of the Distinguished Service Cross, Military Cross, Distinguished Flying Cross, Air Force Cross, Distinguished Service Medal, Military Medal, Distinguished Flying Medal, and Air Force Medal.

Recipients

See also
 Orders, decorations, and medals of New Zealand
 New Zealand gallantry awards
 New Zealand bravery awards
 New Zealand campaign medals

Notes

References
 Mackay, J and Mussel, J (eds) - Medals Yearbook - 2005, (2004), Token Publishing.

External links
 New Zealand Defence Force - Medal information page
 New Zealand Defence Force - Text of the Royal warrant for the New Zealand Gallantry awards system

Military awards and decorations of New Zealand
Courage awards